Armando Castillo (20 May 1932 – 2 February 2006) was a Guatemalan cyclist. He competed in the 4,000 metres team pursuit at the 1952 Summer Olympics.

References

1932 births
2006 deaths
Guatemalan male cyclists
Olympic cyclists of Guatemala
Cyclists at the 1952 Summer Olympics